Euloge Daniel Ahodikpe (born 1 May 1983) is a French-born Togolese footballer who plays as a midfielder for US Chantilly.

Career
Ahodikpe started his senior career at Créteil and subsequently played for Lombard-Pápa TFC and a loan period at Diósgyőri VTK before moving to Diyarbakırspor. In the summer of 2012 he joined English non-league club Macclesfield Town  but departed from the club in late September, opting to return to France.

References

External links
 HLSZ Profile
 
 
 Profile at foot-national.com

1983 births
Living people
Footballers from Paris
Association football midfielders
French sportspeople of Togolese descent
Citizens of Togo through descent
Togolese footballers
French footballers
Togo international footballers
Ligue 2 players
UAE First Division League players
Lille OSC players
Amiens SC players
US Créteil-Lusitanos players
Lombard-Pápa TFC footballers
Diósgyőri VTK players
Diyarbakırspor footballers
Macclesfield Town F.C. players
Al-Taawon (UAE) Club players
Togolese expatriate footballers
Expatriate footballers in Hungary
US Chantilly players